The Rose in the Fist (RnP) was a political alliance of parties in Italy.

The RnP was composed of the Italian Democratic Socialists (SDI; a social-democratic party led by Enrico Boselli and Roberto Villetti), the Italian Radicals (RI; a liberal-libertarian party led by Marco Pannella and Emma Bonino) and some independent members gathered in the Association for the Rose in the Fist (including Lanfranco Turci, Salvatore Buglio, and Biagio De Giovanni).

RnP was part of the centre-left coalition The Union, and was one of the main supporters of gay rights, abortion and euthanasia in Italian politics.

History
The federation was constituted in September 2005, during a convention held in Fiuggi, based on the political principles of José Luis Rodríguez Zapatero (excluding foreign policy, where the Radicals have an Atlanticist, pro-American stance), Tony Blair and Loris Fortuna. In November, its official definition was finally announced. Its symbol was the fist and rose, the emblem of the Socialist International and many socialist and social democratic parties around the world. It had been the historical logo of the Radical Party during the 1970s and the 1980s.

The Radical component of the alliance created some friction with the more Catholic-inspired components of The Union, such as Democracy is Freedom – The Daisy and the UDEUR Populars. The Socialist component was made up mostly of veterans of the Italian Socialist Party. There was also the so-called "third component", composed mainly by former Democrats of the Left, such as Lanfranco Turci, Salvatore Buglio and Biagio De Giovanni, gathered in the Association for the Rose in the Fist.

In the Prodi II Cabinet the RnP was represented by Radical Emma Bonino, who served as Minister of European Affairs and International Trade.

The alliance was disbanded in December 2007, upon which the SDI merged with the Association for the Rose in the Fist and other minor movements to form the current-day Italian Socialist Party.

Composition
It was composed of the following political parties:

Popular support
The federation presented its own lists for the 2006 general election, obtaining 2.6% of votes, and winning 18 seats (9 for SDI, 7 for the Radicals, one for Lanfranco Turci and one for Salvatore Buglio) in the Chamber of Deputies and no seats in the Senate.

This was not an encouraging result, indeed a bad one, considering that the Radicals alone scored 2.3% both at the 2001 general election and at the 2004 European Parliament election, while the Socialists had an electoral force of 2–3% in regional and local elections.

In particular, it seems that the Radicals lost votes to Forza Italia in their Northern strongholds (as Piedmont, Lombardy, Veneto and Friuli-Venezia Giulia), while the Socialists did the same in favour of The Olive Tree coalition in their Southern strongholds (as Abruzzo, Campania, Apulia, Basilicata and Calabria). The table below shows how the two parties were not able to secure the favour of their usual voters, so that the Rose in the Fist scored less than Radicals alone in the North and the Socialists alone in the South.

Electoral results

Italian Parliament

External links
Official website

References

Radical parties in Italy
Political parties established in 2005
Political parties disestablished in 2007
Defunct political party alliances in Italy
2005 establishments in Italy
2007 disestablishments in Italy